Wildwood is a city in Sumter County, Florida, United States. The population was 6,709 at the 2010 census.  According to the U.S. Census Bureau's 2018 estimates, the city had a population of 7,024. Due to rapid growth the city had over 33,000 residents by October of 2022 with plans to swell to over 100,000 in the foreseeable future.

Geography

Wildwood is located at  (28.858610, –82.038499).

According to the United States Census Bureau, the city has a total area of 13.4 km2 (5.2 mi2).

Demographics

As of the census of 2000, there were 3,924 people, 1,640 households, and 1,074 families residing in the city. The racial makeup of the city was 64.76% White, 32.93% African American, 0.13% Native American, 0.13% Asian, 0.97% from other races, and 1.10% from two or more races. Hispanic or Latino of any race were 2.42% of the population.

There were 1,640 households, out of which 23.0% had children under the age of 18 living with them, 44.6% were married couples living together, 17.2% had a female householder with no husband present, and 34.5% were non-families. 30.8% of all households were made up of individuals, and 20.2% had someone living alone who was 65 years of age or older.  The average household size was 2.28 and the average family size was 2.81.

In the city the population was spread out, with 22.3% under the age of 18, 6.5% from 18 to 24, 18.4% from 25 to 44, 19.0% from 45 to 64, and 33.8% who were 65 years of age or older.  The median age was 48 years. For every 100 females, there were 83.2 males.  For every 100 females age 18 and over, there were 79.2 males.

The median income for a household in the city was $23,357, and the median income for a family was $27,247. Males had a median income of $23,250 versus $18,103 for females. The per capita income for the city was $11,758.  About 17.3% of families and 21.7% of the population were below the poverty line, including 39.6% of those under age 18 and 8.1% of those age 65 or over.

History
A post office called Wildwood has been in operation since 1881. The town was named for its remote location in the woods.

In April 2015, The Villages petitioned the city of Wildwood with plans to build 785 new homes on County Road 466A, across from Pinellas Plaza. Wildwood leaders rejected the expansion efforts citing concerns of the city losing its identity when it was to become overwhelmed by The Villages. On April 27, 2015, The Villages formally withdrew their plans for expansion, indicating that the City of Wildwood officials made too many requests that would be a “disservice to our residents and business partners". There are no known plans for further expansion of The Villages into the city of Wildwood.

Crossroads of Florida

Wildwood is located at the juncture of Interstate 75, Florida's Turnpike, State Road 44, and U.S. Highway 301. For many years Wildwood was the northern control city on Turnpike road signs however this was replaced with Ocala, Florida beginning in 2007. Because of its centralized location and easy access to both coasts, it is often referred to as "The Crossroads of Florida". Wildwood station operates as a CSX maintenance yard, and until 2004, was served by Amtrak's Palmetto between New York City and Tampa. Amtrak's Thruway Motorcoach bus service makes a stop in Wildwood. The bus travels from Jacksonville to Dade City, and is timed to meet arrivals and departures of the Silver Star train in Jacksonville. The Florida Midland Railroad owns an abandoned railroad spur that once led to Leesburg, but now solely serves as a home for several abandoned freight cars along County Road 44A.

In the latter 20th century, Wildwood served as a division point and rail yard for the Seaboard Air Line Railroad (SAL), and later the Seaboard Coast Line (SCL) and Seaboard System Railroads. SAL, SCL and Amtrak passenger trains from New York City and the midwest were split and combined here to serve St. Petersburg and Miami until the 1990's. Wildwood continues to host Wildwood Yard, which is now used by CSX Transportation, a successor to the Seaboard.

Neighborhoods
The city now includes the historic community of Orange Home.

Notable people
 Elizabeth Cook, country music singer and radio personality
 Ron Dixon, former player of the National Football League
 Dana Fuchs, singer, songwriter, actress and voice-over artist, portrayed Sadie in 2007 film Across the Universe
 Ellis Johnson, former player of the National Football League
 Dan Sikes, former professional golfer
 Barbara J. Stephenson, Diplomat

References

Cities in Sumter County, Florida
Cities in Florida